The McConnell's Mill Covered Bridge is a wooden covered bridge in Slippery Rock Township, Lawrence County, Pennsylvania, United States.  It spans the Slippery Rock Creek in McConnells Mill State Park, southeast of Rose Point,  Built in 1874, the bridge is a Howe truss built on stone foundations and supported by steel girders.

Unlike many Pennsylvania counties, Lawrence County never possessed many covered bridges; perhaps only five such bridges were ever built in the county.  Today, only the McConnells Mill Covered Bridge and the Banks Covered Bridge near Volant remain.  The McConnell's Mill bridge is particularly significant for its usage of the Howe truss design; it is one of only four extant Howe truss bridges statewide.

In 1980, the bridge was recognized for its historical significance by being placed on the National Register of Historic Places, along with the Banks Bridge.

See also
List of bridges documented by the Historic American Engineering Record in Pennsylvania

References

External links

Bridges completed in 1874
Covered bridges on the National Register of Historic Places in Pennsylvania
Covered bridges in Lawrence County, Pennsylvania
Wooden bridges in Pennsylvania
Transportation buildings and structures in Lawrence County, Pennsylvania
Tourist attractions in Lawrence County, Pennsylvania
Historic American Engineering Record in Pennsylvania
National Register of Historic Places in Lawrence County, Pennsylvania
Road bridges on the National Register of Historic Places in Pennsylvania
Howe truss bridges in the United States